The Empire Trilogy is a collaborative trilogy of political fantasy novels by American writers Raymond E. Feist and Janny Wurts, set in the fictional world of Kelewan.

Novels
The trilogy traces the story of Mara of the Acoma's rise to power from a convent novitiate to the most powerful woman in Kelewan.  These three books are contemporary to Feist's original Riftwar Saga and feature some crossover characters, mainly from Magician (1982) (Pug, the protagonist of Magician, appears twice in Servant of the Empire (1990) and once in Mistress of the Empire (1992)).  Mara struggles to rule her family after her father and brother are killed in a trap set by the Minwanabi, one of the most powerful families in the Empire and longtime enemies of the Acoma. Mara quickly learns how to play the Game of the Council with skill and challenges the binding traditions of her world.

The feudal Empire of Tsuranuanni as depicted in the series, features social and political institutions which show a clear influence both of feudal Japan and Imperial China, while some of the characters have Nahuatl-influenced names.

Both Feist and Wurts have ruled out any further novels featuring these characters.

Daughter of the Empire (1987)

In the world of Kelewan, Mara of the Acoma must lead her followers through terror and peril while surviving the ruthless Game of the Council.  Mara must plot, bend tradition, avoid assassination attempts, and trade her heart for power in order to save the Acoma from destruction.

Servant of the Empire (1990)

Mara of the Acoma has now become an expert player in the Game of the Council through bloody political maneuvering.  After buying a group of Midkemian prisoners-of-war, she discovers one of them, Kevin of Zun, is a noble who reveals himself a great asset in regards to the Game of the Council.

Mistress of the Empire (1992)

After rising to power, Mara of the Acoma must face the power of the brotherhood of assassins, the spies of rival houses, and the might of the Assembly—who see her as a threat to their power.

References

Fantasy novel trilogies
Collaborative book series
Works by Raymond E. Feist